Helmut Möckel (21 June 1909 – 15 February 1945) was a German youth leader and politician.

Background
Möckel was born in Vielau near Zwickau in Saxony. After completing his school education he studied education and economics at Technische Universität Dresden and political science at University of Vienna. He helped found the National Socialist Teachers League in 1929 and joined the Nazi Party in 1930. From 1930 to 1933 he was a member of the SS. He became a full-time field leader of the Hitler Youth in 1933 and staff director in 1935.

On 16 July 1937, Möckel became chief of the Office of Procurement for the Reich Youth Leadership. In April 1938 he was proposed, unsuccessfully, for membership of the Reichstag. He returned to Saxony to become a Hitler Youth field guide and was promoted to Gebietsführer for Saxony in August 1938. During his time as a Hitler Youth leader he wrote books on the subject of youth training.

World War II
At the outbreak of World War II in 1939, he was drafted into the Wehrmacht and trained as a fighter pilot. However, in August 1940 he was recalled to Berlin where he was appointed Stabsführer of the Hitler Youth and deputy to Reichsjugendführer Baldur von Schirach. In October 1940 he was appointed by von Schirach to oversee the day-to-day operation of Kinderlandverschickung ("relocation of children to the countryside") from major cities at risk of aerial bombing.

In November 1942, Möckel became a member of the Reichstag, nominally representing Breslau (now Wroclaw in Poland). On 11 February 1945 he was awarded the Ritterkreuz des Kriegsverdienstkreuzes mit Schwertern (Knight's Cross of the War Merit Cross with swords).

Death
Möckel was killed in a car accident in Darmstadt on 15 February 1945 whilst recruiting Hitler Youth volunteers for Operation Werwolf. There were rumours that his death was faked and he had fled to Francoist Spain, but this has never been substantiated.

He was succeeded as Stabsführer by Kurt Petter.

References

1909 births
1945 deaths
Hitler Youth members
Nazi Party officials
Luftwaffe pilots
Members of the Reichstag of Nazi Germany
People from the Kingdom of Saxony
University of Vienna alumni
TU Dresden alumni
Road incident deaths in Germany
Recipients of the Knights Cross of the War Merit Cross
SS personnel